Bush House may refer to:

in Britain
 Bush House, Grade II listed building located in the Strand Campus of King's College London, London
 Arnolfini, known also as Bush House, Bristol
 Bush House near Penicuik, home to the Edinburgh Centre for Rural Economy (ECRE)

in the United States
Bush House (Grove Hill, Alabama), listed on the National Register of Historic Places (NRHP)
Bush House (Little Rock, Arkansas), NRHP-listed
Bush-Dubisson House, Little Rock, Arkansas, listed on the NRHP in Arkansas
Bush-Holley House, Greenwich, Connecticut, NRHP-listed
Bush-Usher House, Lumpkin, Georgia, listed on the NRHP in Georgia
John D. Bush House, Exira, Iowa, listed on the NRHP in Iowa
Capt. Robert V. Bush House, Becknerville, Kentucky, listed on the NRHP in Kentucky
William Bush House, Elizabethtown, Kentucky, listed on the NRHP in Kentucky
Bush-Dykes, W., House, Forest Grove, Kentucky, listed on the NRHP in Kentucky
Cornelia Bush House, Louisville, Kentucky, listed on the NRHP in Kentucky
S. S. Bush House, Louisville, Kentucky, listed on the NRHP in Kentucky
John G. Bush House, Dover, Minnesota, listed on the NRHP in Minnesota
Bush House (New Hebron, Mississippi), listed on the NRHP in Mississippi
Horace and Grace Bush House, Penfield, New York, NRHP-listed
Bush-Lyon Homestead, Port Chester, New York, NRHP-listed
Samuel Bush House, Lancaster, Ohio, listed on the NRHP in Ohio
Asahel Bush House, Salem, Oregon, NRHP-listed
Bush House (Inman, South Carolina), NRHP-listed
George W. Bush Childhood Home, Midland, Texas, NRHP-listed